Sebastián Durón (19 April (baptized) 1660 – 3 August 1716)  was a Spanish composer.

Life and career
Sebastián Durón Picazo was, with Antonio de Literes, the greatest Spanish composer of stage music of his time. He was born in Brihuega, Guadalajara, Spain, and was taught by his brother Diego Durón, also a composer. Sebastián served as organist and choirmaster at various cathedrals (Seville, Cuenca, El Burgo de Osma, Plasencia) until in 1691, when he was appointed organist of the Royal Chapel of King Charles II in Madrid. The new king King Philip V appointed him chapel master of this institution in 1701. He remained in this position until 1706, when he was suspended because of expressing support for Archduke Charles of Austria during the War of Spanish Succession, which ended with the victory of Bourbon King Philip V. Durón was forced into exile in France. In 1715 he was appointed chaplain to the exiled queen Mariana of Neuburg, the widow of Charles II, in Bayonne. He died in 1716 of tuberculosis at Cambo-les-Bains, Aquitaine, France.

Although Durón composed many sacred pieces, and these and his villancicos were taken to the New World, his main influence was in the zarzuela.

Father Benito Jerónimo Feijoo (1676–1764) criticised Durón, compared to Literes, for the worldliness of his compositions.

Stage works 
 1696 Salir el amor del mundo (libretto by ¿José de Cañizares?). Zarzuela in two acts.
 1697 Muerte en amor es la ausencia (libretto by Antonio de Zamora). Mythological Comedy in three acts.
 c. 1697 Selva encantada de amor. Zarzuela in two acts.
 c. 1701 La guerra de los gigantes. 1 act.
 1704 Hasta lo insensible adora (libretto by José de Cañizares). Zarzuela in two acts.
 c. 1705 Apolo y Dafne (anonymous libretto). Zarzuela in two acts (first act contains the music of Navas).
 c. 1705 Coronis (libretto by an anonymous poet). Zarzuela in two acts.
 1711 22 January (revival date . Premniere c. 1706)Veneno es de amor la envidia (libretto by Antonio de Zamora, possibly with the participation of José Cañizares). Zarzuela in two acts: Madrid.
 1711 25 December (revival date. Premniere c. 1702) Las nuevas armas de amor (libretto by José de Cañizares). Zarzuela in two acts: Madrid.

Selected discography 
 Tonadas (Songs), Raquel Andueza. Naxos.
 selections on Barroco Español, Vol. 2, Vol. 3, by Al Ayre Español, cond. Eduardo Lopéz Banzo. DHM
 La Guerra de los Gigantes—A Corte Musical, Rogério Concalves Pan Classics, 2013
 Lágrimas, Amor - Arias for Soprano—Eva Juárez, A Corte Musical, Rogério Concalves Pan Classics, 2016
 Coronis - Le poème harmonique, Vincent Dumestre Outhere, 2022

References

Bibliography
 Hudson, Barton (1961), A Portuguese Source of Seventeenth-Century Iberian Organ Music, PhD, Indiana, Indiana University.
 Siemens Hernández, Lothar (1967), Six Tientos: Andrés de Sola y Sebastián Durón, Paris, Éditions musicales de la Schola Cantorum, Orgue et Liturgie, n.º 74.
 Verdú, Paulino Capdepón; Juan José Pastor (eds.), (2013), Sebastián Durón y la música de su época. Vigo: Editorial Académica del Hispanismo.

External links
 
 Sebastián Durón Project. (in Spanish)
 Flowers of Music in the Gardens of Palaces. (Gaytilla and Tiento of Sebastián Durón / Organ, 17th century, close to the birthplace of Durón)

1660 births
1716 deaths
18th-century classical composers
18th-century male musicians
18th-century musicians
Spanish Baroque composers
Spanish male classical composers
People from the Province of Guadalajara